Matthias Kohl (born August 14, 1973 in Vilseck, Germany) is a German mathematician and statistician who is known for his contributions to the asymptotic theory of robustness and robust statistics. Kohl studied mathematics at the University of Bayreuth and earned his PhD in mathematics there, in 2005. His dissertation was entitled 'Numerical Contributions to the Asymptotic Theory of Robustness'.

He spent the first half of his career at the University of Jena as a biostatistician. At Jena, he worked on problems in the analysis of high dimensional biological data, the development and validation of microarray-based predictive models and study design. He then became professor at Furtwangen University. There, his research area are statistical methods for biomarker development and molecular diagnostics.

Publications (books)
 M. Kohl, H.P. Deigner. Precision Medicine: Tools and Quantitative Approaches. 1st Edition, 2018, 374 pages. eBook , Paperback 
 M. Kohl. Einführung in das Programmieren mit R. 1. Auflage, 2016, .
 M. Kohl. Introduction to statistical data analysis with R. 1st edition, 2015, 228 pages, free. .
 M. Kohl. Analyse von Genexpressionsdaten – mit R und Bioconductor. 1. Auflage, 2013,

References

External links
His personal website
His institutional website

1973 births
Living people
People from Amberg-Sulzbach
German statisticians
University of Bayreuth alumni
21st-century German mathematicians